Andrey Viktorovich Rudensky (born 26 January 1959) is a Soviet and Russian film and stage actor.

Biography 
Andrey Rudensky was born in Sverdlovsk, Russian SFSR, Soviet Union (now Yekaterinburg, Russia). In a military family. He graduated from the Sverdlovsk Polytechnic with a degree in  rolling production, then he studied at Ural State Academy of Architecture and Arts. In 1984 he graduated from Mikhail Shchepkin Higher Theatre School (course of Viktor Korshunov). Since 1993 to 2001 he played in the company of the Moscow New Drama Theatre.

Currently, Andrey is not busy in the theater.

Not married, no children.

Selected filmography
 The Life of Klim Samgin (1987) as  Klim Ivanovich Samgin
 Sea Wolf (1990  as Humphrey Van Weyden
 Demons (1992) as Stavrogin
 And Quiet Flows the Don (1992) as Yevgeny Listnitsky
 Roman Alla Russa (1994) as Mario Fonitsetti
 Our God’s Brother (1997) as Polish artist
 Request Stop (1999) as Sergey Klenin
 Empire under Attack (2000) as Pyotr Stoedzinsky
 Request Stop 2 (2001) as Sergey Klenin
 Another Life (2003) as Igor
  Yesenin  (2005) as Alexander Blok
 The Turkish Gambit (2005) as Lestvitsky
 Wolfhound (2006) as Tilorn
 The Stepfather (2007) as Leonid
 Kromov (2009) as Stenbok
   Jolly Fellows (2009) as Gosha
Eagle Eye (2011) as  Gladiator 
 Cruise (2011) as Valentin Nazimov
Lecturer (2011) as Domaskin, monk
 Thin Ice (2015) as Boris Chuysky
 A Rough Draft (2018) as Kirill's father

References

External links
 
 Неофициальный сайт Андрея Руденского
 Андрей Руденский на Рускино

1959 births
Living people
Actors from Yekaterinburg
Soviet male film actors
Soviet male stage actors
Soviet male television actors
Russian male film actors
Russian male stage actors
Russian male television actors
20th-century Russian male actors
21st-century Russian male actors